Daylight Robbery is a thriller novel written by Surender Mohan Pathak, a Hindi writer from Delhi, India.Originally published in 1980 by Shanu Paperbacks, it was translated into English by Sudarshan Purohit and published by Blaft Publications, Chennai, India in 2010.

It is the 8th novel in the Vimal series, and revolves around the robbery of a payroll van in Agra. The novel is unique in the sense that this is the first time Vimal engages in a crime for his own personal benefit (till now all he did was under threat of other hard-core criminals). Dawarkanath, an aged gambler from Agra, tells him of a great artist, a plastic surgeon called Dr. Earl Slater, who would operate only on wanted Indian criminals (for an amazingly high fee, of course). If Vimal (actual name Sardar Surender Singh Sohal), a wanted criminal in several Indian states and NCR, can get a new face, he can live safe from both the law and its breakers. That's what pulls him in Dwarkanath's amazingly inhuman scheme - it would involve crashing the cash-carrying armoured van "like a piano accordion" ! along with the driver and security guard. The officer in charge of Ratanakar Steel Mill, whose weak point is his shamelessly materialistic wife, is blackmailed to give-in a very complicated machination, exploiting his love for gambling. The team somehow pulls off their plan but things (as they always happen to poor Vimal) go wrong - Dwarkanath dies of a heart attack, the young and naive Kooka (another cooperator) loses both money and life, the money goes back to where it belongs and Vimal is left with empty pockets, his dream of a new face shattered and a long dark road full of underworld adventures stretching in front of him.

References

External links
Tehelka article
Express India article

Indian crime novels
Novels by Surender Mohan Pathak
Indian thriller novels
Novels set in Uttar Pradesh
1980 Indian novels